Nelson Mandela: A Biography is a biography written by Martin Meredith on Nelson Mandela. The book details Mandela's early life and major influences on him, his moving to Johannesburg, joining the African National Congress, his imprisonment on Robben Island, and eventually, his Presidency. Also chronicled are the rise and fall of apartheid, the scandals involving Winnie Mandela (Nelson's wife), and Thabo Mbeki's term as President. Martina Meredith is known for authoring many books and articles on Africa and the key people within it.

See also
Long Walk to Freedom, Mandela's autobiography

Biographies of Nelson Mandela